Smash Your Head on the Punk Rock is a compilation album by the American indie rock band Sebadoh. It was released in 1992, and marked the band's debut on Sub Pop.

It includes four of the eight songs from their Rocking the Forest EP, and eight of the nine songs from their Sebadoh vs Helmet EP. Both EPs were released in Europe on Domino/20/20 Recordings in early 1992. Eric Gaffney contributed the majority of the album artwork, and the title, which was lifted for a SPIN article on Nirvana in 1994, and was taken for a book title of the same name, by Matt Bissonnette.

"Vampire" was released as the compilation's single.

Critical reception
Rob Sheffield, in The New Rolling Stone Album Guide, called "Brand New Love" one of Barlow's best songs, and an "anthemic losercore ballad."

Track listing 
"Crisis" (Gaffney) - 2:52  *
"Brand New Love" (Barlow) - 4:04
"Notsur Dnoura Selcric" (Loewenstein) - 3:04
"Vampire" (Barlow) - 2:43 *
"Good Things" (Barlow) - 1:26
"Cecilia Chime in Melee" (Gaffney) - 4:19
"Everybody's Been Burned" (David Crosby) 3:15
"Junk Bonds" - (Loewenstein) 1:53 *
"New Worship" (Barlow) - 2:21
"Mean Distance" (Gaffney) - 3:12
"Pink Moon" (Nick Drake) - 2:02
"Mind Meld" (Fay) - 7:10 *

An asterisk (*) denotes tracks taken from Rocking the Forest.

Personnel
Lou Barlow - Guitar, Vocals, Bass
Jason Loewenstein - Bass, Drums, Vocals, Guitar
Eric Gaffney - Guitar, Vocal, Drums, Bass, Synthesizer
Bob Fay - Drums, Guitar, Vocals
 Recorded by Bob Weston

References

1992 compilation albums
Sebadoh compilation albums
Sub Pop compilation albums